Albert-Jean, pen name for Marie, Joseph, Albert, François Jean (28 June 1892 – 7 September 1975), was a 20th-century French poet, novelist and playwright.

Familiar with the Grand-Guignol, Albert-Jean was president of the Société des gens de lettres.

Main publications 
Poetry
1912: La Pluie au printemps
1913: L'Ombre des fumées

Novels
1914: Maude et les trois jeunes gens 
1920: La Dame aux écailles 
1925: Le Singe. This novel, co-written with Maurice Renard features the writer J.-H. Rosny aîné.
1926: Une rose à la main 
1942: Belles du sud
1946: La Maison du vent 
1950: Le Secret de Barbe-Bleue 
1950: Amours à Saint-Domingue

Theatre
1925: L'étrange histoire du Professeur Stierbecke
1925: L'Amant de la morte (at the Grand-Guignol)
1933: 600 000 francs par mois 
1932: Tantale

References

External links 
 
 Albert-Jean on data.bnf.fr

20th-century French novelists
20th-century French male writers
20th-century French dramatists and playwrights
1892 births
People from Hérault
1975 deaths
20th-century French poets
French male poets
French male novelists
French male dramatists and playwrights